Maček is a surname. Notable people with the name include:

 Borut Maček (born 1966), Slovenian handball coach
 Boštjan Maček (born 1979), Slovenian sport shooter
 Ivan Maček (1908–1993), Slovenian communist politician
 Ivo Maček (1914–2002), Croatian pianist
 Vladko Maček (1879–1964), Croatian politician
 Vlasta Maček (born 1952), Croatian chess master

See also
 Macek
 Mašek

Slovene-language surnames
Croatian surnames